Kimco Realty Corporation is a real estate investment trust that invests in shopping centers. As of March 31, 2022, the company owned interests in 537 U.S. shopping centers and mixed-use assets comprising 93 million square feet of gross leasable space.

The company also specializes in shopping center ownership, management, acquisitions, and value enhancing redevelopment activities for more than 60 years. As of September 30, 2022, the company owned interests in 526 U.S. shopping centers and mixed-use assets comprising 91 million square feet of gross leasable space.

Kimco Realty was the first public vertically integrated REIT designed to be internally managed and advised, providing its own property and asset management.

History
Kimco Realty Corporation was founded in 1966 by a group of real estate investors, including Martin Kimmel and Milton Cooper, who merged their retail assets, thus the company's name of Kim-co.

In 1991, the company became a public company via an initial public offering, raising $120 million.

In 1998, the company acquired Price REIT for $535 million in stock.

In October 2003, the company acquired Mid-Atlantic Realty Trust for $441 million.

In 2007, the company acquired Birchwood Development Company for $92 million.

In August 2021, the company acquired Weingarten Realty.

References

External links

Companies listed on the New York Stock Exchange
Real estate companies established in 1960
Companies based in Nassau County, New York
Real estate investment trusts of the United States
1960 establishments in New York (state)